Boğazköy is a quarter of the city Amasya, Amasya District, Amasya Province, Turkey. Its population is 682 (2021).

References

Amasya